A monde, meaning 'world' in French, is an orb located near the top of a crown. It represents, as the name suggests, the world that the monarch rules. It is the point at which a crown's half arches meet. It is usually topped off either with a national or religious symbol, for example a cross in Christian countries.

Gallery

See also 
Globus cruciger

Crowns (headgear)